Zakiruddin Zaki was an author, writer and social activist during the era of the Bhopal State.

Biography
Zakiruddin Zaki was born in 1859. He was employed in the Department of Survey at Bhopal state and loved to write poetry. He died in Tijara.
He belongs to a well-known and artistically successful family. He was the elder brother of the writer and poet Kabiruddin Kalim.

Life as scholar
Zaki was his pen name. In 1923, he wrote a book,  on the life of the Islamic Prophet Muhammad and the Caliph Ali.

Marriage and children
With his first wife, Wahidun Nisan (daughter of Shahabuddin ibn Mohammad Imamuddin of Tijara), he had a son, Azizuddin. With his second wife, Fatima (daughter of Imtiaz Ali Ibn Ghulam Nabi), he had no children. With his third wife, Bismillah Begum, he had sons Sabir Ali, Shakir Ali and Sajid Ali and daughters Alia Begum and Razia Begum.

See also
 Ghulam Mansoor
 Ghulam Ahmad Faroghi
 Kabiruddin 'Kalim'

References

Indian Muslims
Writers from Bhopal
1859 births
People from Tijara
Urdu-language non-fiction writers
Year of death missing
Place of birth unknown